Karbalai Mohammad Hoseyn (also Romanized as Karbalā’ī Moḩammad Ḩoseyn; also known as Karbalā’ī Moḩammad Ḩoseynī) is a village in Khorram Makan Rural District, Kamfiruz District, Marvdasht County, Fars Province, Iran. At the 2006 census, its population was 497, in 88 families.

References 

Populated places in Marvdasht County